Arola Aparicio Gili (born 24 September 1997) is a Spanish footballer who plays as a forward for Eibar.

Club career
Aparicio started her career at Sant Gabriel's academy.

References

External links
Profile at La Liga

1997 births
Living people
Women's association football forwards
Spanish women's footballers
People from Vallès Oriental
Sportspeople from the Province of Barcelona
Footballers from Catalonia
FC Barcelona Femení B players
SD Eibar Femenino players
Primera División (women) players
Segunda Federación (women) players
Sportswomen from Catalonia
Spanish expatriate women's footballers
Expatriate women's soccer players in the United States